Peter Sajwani (born 27 May 1977) is a former Swedish darts player.

Sajwani was born in Las Palmas, Spain, to an Indian father and a Swedish mother.

Career
He won the 2014 Torremolinos Open, beating John Roberts in the final 4–1. In June 2014, he competed in the 2014 PDC World Cup of Darts with his playing partner Magnus Caris; they both lost their singles games in the second round against Scotland's Peter Wright and Robert Thornton to exit the tournament. He qualified for the 2015 BDO World Darts Championship, where he played Sam Head in the Preliminary round, winning 3–0. In the First Round, he played the number one seed James Wilson, winning 3–1. He played Robbie Green in the Second round, but lost 4-0.

World Championship results

BDO

 2015: 2nd Round (lost to Robbie Green 0-4)
 2016: 1st Round (lost to Mark McGeeney 0-3)

External links
Peter Sajwani's profile and stats on Darts Database

References

1977 births
Living people
Swedish darts players
Swedish people of Indian descent
British Darts Organisation players
PDC World Cup of Darts Swedish team